Newgate Market can refer to:

 A market formerly held on Newgate, in London
 The former name of Shambles Market, in York